The 5th Wildflower Film Awards is an awards ceremony recognizing the achievements of Korean independent and low-budget films. It was held at the Literature House in Seoul on April 12, 2018. 

This year awards includes a new category for Best Music and Best Producer. A total of 13 prizes were handed out to films nominated across 10 categories for both documentary and narrative works, each with a budget under  and released theatrically between January 1 and December 31, 2017.

Nominations and winners
(Winners denoted in bold)

References

External links 

Wildflower Film Awards
Wildflower Film Awards
Wildflower Film Awards